Serbian League East (Serbian: Српска лига Исток / Srpska liga Istok) is one of four sections of the Serbian League, the third national tier. The other three sections are Serbian League Belgrade, Serbian League Vojvodina and Serbian League West. It is also the highest regional league for the eastern part of Serbia.

The league was founded in 2003 following a merger between the Serbian League Niš and the Serbian League Timok.

Format
The league is formed by 16 clubs which play all against one another twice, once at home, once away. Champion Serbian League East goes to Serbian First League. From Serbian League East relegated 3 teams in Zone Leagues.

Winners

Members for 2022–23 

The following 16 clubs compete in the Serbian League East during the 2022–23 season.

Previous seasons

Relegated teams (from First League to Serbian League East)

Relegated teams (from Serbian League East to Zone League)

Promoted teams (from Zone league to Serbian League East)

All-time table 2006–2016 
The following is a list of clubs who have played in the Serbian League East at any time since its formation in 2006 to the current season. Teams playing in the 2015–16 Serbian League East season are indicated in bold. A total of 42 teams have played in the Serbian League East. The table is accurate as of the end of the 2014–15 season.

League or status at 2015–16:

See also
 Serbian League Belgrade
 Serbian League Vojvodina
 Serbian League West

References

External links
 Football Association of Serbia
 Football Association of East Serbia

 
East